Franklintown Historic District  is a national historic district in Baltimore, Maryland, United States. It is the result of a plan developed in 1832 by William H. Freeman (1790–1863), a local politician and entrepreneur. His plan evolved gradually over the course of several decades and owes its success to his untiring promotion of the village. The central feature is an oval plan with radiating lots around a central wooded park.  The district includes an old stone grist mill known as Franklin Mill, the innovative radiating oval plan, and the associated hotel and commercial area.  
The key residential buildings are excellent examples of the "I"-house form and display steeply pitched cross gables found in vernacular rural buildings throughout much of Maryland.

It was added to the National Register of Historic Places in 2001.

References

External links
, including photo from 2001, at Maryland Historical Trust
Boundary Map of the Franklintown Historic District, Baltimore City, at Maryland Historical Trust

Georgian architecture in Maryland
Historic districts on the National Register of Historic Places in Baltimore